Crane Point Museum, Nature Center and Historic Site is a non-profit natural history museum and nature center located in the City of Marathon on Key Vaca, in the heart of the Florida Keys in Monroe County, Florida, United States. Created in 1976, the Florida Keys Land & Sea Trust purchased the land and saved the area from being developed into private homes and shopping malls.  The facility was listed on the National Register of Historic Places in 2021.

Crane Point features several facilities:

 Museum of Natural History of the Florida Keys  - Exhibits focus on the natural and cultural history of the Keys area, including Calusa Indians, Spanish explorers and other Keys pioneers, pirates, a diorama of a coral reef, butterflies, tree snails, sea turtles, shells, Key deer and local tropical fish.  The museum was established in 1990.  The museum is part of the Smithsonian Traveling Exhibit, from the Smithsonian Institution's National Museum of Natural History, that contains depictions of Keys heritage and landscapes.
 Florida Keys Children's Museum - features two saltwater lagoons and many marine touch tanks which contain native Keys invertebrates and fish, including a nurse shark, as well as an interactive pirate play area.
 George Adderley House - a historic house museum that was built by George Adderley, a Bahamian pioneer, in 1903 that still stands on Crane Point's property.  The exterior of the house was constructed with Tabby, a concrete-like material made of burned conch and other shells and sand.
 Marathon Wild Bird Center - a rehabilitation center for injured and orphaned wild birds.  Opened in 1998, the center also offers education programs and research projects.  Some recovering birds can be viewed in the outdoor flight cage.
 Nature trails

Crane Point was formerly known as Tropical Crane Point Hammock.

References
 Insiders' Guide to the Florida Keys and Key West
 "Crane Point Museum and Nature Center", Keys Living, May 27, 2008

External links and references

 Official site
 Marathon Wild Bird Center

Museums in Monroe County, Florida
Environmental organizations based in Florida
Nature centers in Florida
Wildlife rehabilitation and conservation centers
Natural history museums in Florida
Children's museums in Florida
Tourist attractions in the Florida Keys
Marathon, Florida
1976 establishments in Florida
National Register of Historic Places in Monroe County, Florida